Man with the Transplanted Brain  is a 1972 French-Italian-West German science fiction-drama film written and directed by Jacques Doniol-Valcroze. It is loosely based on a novel by Alain Franck and Victor Vicas.

Plot 
The head of a neurosurgical clinic, Professor Jean Marcilly, famous brain specialist, condemned by an incurable heart disease, pushes Dr. Robert Degagnac to transplant his brain into the young 23-year-old Franz Eckerman, a former racer and race car tester, victim of a car crash.

Cast 
 Mathieu Carrière 
 Nicoletta Machiavelli 
 Marianne Eggerickx
 Michel Duchaussoy
 Jean-Pierre Aumont
  Martine Sarcey 
 Benoît Allemane
 Monique Mélinand
 Andrée Tainsy
 Christian Duroc
  Pierre Santini

References

Further reading

     Michel Grisolia, Cinéma 72 (166). May 1972. p. 152.
     Marcel Martin, Écran 72 (7). July 1972. p. 74.
     Dominique Maillet, La Revue du cinéma (263-264). September 1972. p. 130.

External links

1972 films
Films directed by Jacques Doniol-Valcroze
Films based on French novels
1970s science fiction drama films
Italian science fiction drama films
French science fiction drama films
Films about brain transplants
1972 drama films
1970s French films
1970s Italian films